Sri Vinayaka Vijayamu is a 1979 Telugu-language Hindu mythological film directed by Kamalakara Kameswara Rao and produced by Jagarlamudi Radhakrishna Murthy under Jaganmatha Arts. The film stars Krishnam Raju, Rama Krishna, Vanisri, M. G. V. Madan Gopal, Kaikala Satyanarayana in the lead roles. The music was composed by S. Rajeswara Rao. The lyrics were penned by Devulapalli Krishnasastri, Arudra, Veeturi and Kosaraju. The film is about Lord Ganesha's life from his birth till he tamed Mushikasura, a rakshasa who later became Ganesha's vahana. The film was a major commercial success.

Cast
Krishnam Raju as Lord Shiva
Rama Krishna as Lord Vishnu
Vanisri as Devi Parvati
M. G. V. Madangopal as Sri Ganesha
Kaikala Satyanarayana as Mushikasura
Prabha as Priyamvada
Deepa as Vaishali
Dhulipala Sitaram as Shukracharya
Radhakrishna Murthy
Pushpalatha as Tripura Sundari 
Basavaraju Padmanabham
Nara Venkateswara Rao as Sri Indra
Baby Lakshmi Sudha as young Ganesha
Jayamalini

Soundtrack

References

External links

1979 films
Hindu mythological films
Films directed by Kamalakara Kameswara Rao
Films scored by S. Rajeswara Rao
Indian epic films
1970s Telugu-language films